Priestley Tyler H. Farquharson (born 15 March 1997) is an English professional footballer who plays for Newport County, as a central defender. He has been capped by the England national beach soccer team.

Early and personal life
Farquharson is from London. He attended Brunel University, captaining their football team.

Club career

Non-League and Cymru Premier
After playing in English non-league football with Hitchin Town, Billericay Town, Hayes & Yeading United, Bishop's Stortford, before signing for Connah's Quay Nomads in January 2019. With Connah's Quay Nomads he won the Cymru Premier title and the Welsh League Cup, and won the Cymru Premier Young Player of the Season award for the 2019–20 season.

Newport County
On 21 January 2021 Farquharson signed a two and a half year contract with League Two Newport County for an undisclosed fee. He made his debut for Newport as a second-half substitute in the 1–0 League Two win against Grimsby Town on 6 February 2021. Farquharson played for Newport in the League Two playoff final at Wembley Stadium on 31 May 2021 which Newport lost to Morecambe, 1–0 after a 107th minute penalty. He suffered a knee injury at the end of the 2021–22 season. In August 2022 he was praised by Newport manager James Rowberry.

He scored his first two goals for Newport in the League Two 2–0 win against Gillingham on 19 November 2022.

International career
Farquharson represented England at beach soccer.

Playing style
Primarily a central defender, Farquharson has also played at right-back.

References

1997 births
Living people
Footballers from Greater London
English footballers
Hitchin Town F.C. players
Billericay Town F.C. players
Hayes & Yeading United F.C. players
Bishop's Stortford F.C. players
Connah's Quay Nomads F.C. players
Newport County A.F.C. players
Isthmian League players
Cymru Premier players
English Football League players
Association football defenders
Alumni of Brunel University London
English beach soccer players